17th ADG Awards
February 2, 2013

Period Film:
Anna Karenina

Fantasy Film:
Life of Pi

Contemporary Film:
Skyfall

The 17th Art Directors Guild Awards, which were given on February 2, 2013, honored the best production designers of 2012.

Winners and nominees

Film
 Period Film:
Sarah Greenwood – Anna Karenina
 Peter Borckl – Argo
 David F. Klassen – Django Unchained
 Eve Stewart – Les Misérables
 Rick Carter – Lincoln

 Fantasy Film:
David Gropman – Life of Pi
 Uli Hanisch – Cloud Atlas
 Nathan Crowley, Kevin Kavanaugh – The Dark Knight Rises
 Dan Hennah – The Hobbit: An Unexpected Journey
 Arthur Max – Prometheus

 Contemporary Film:
Dennis Gassner – Skyfall
 Alan MacDonald – The Best Exotic Marigold Hotel
 Nelson Coates – Flight
 Eugenio Caballero – The Impossible
 Jeremy Hindle – Zero Dark Thirty

Television
 One-Hour Single Camera Television Series:
Gemma Jackson – Game of Thrones (for "The Ghost of Harrenhal")
 Bill Groom – Boardwalk Empire (for "Resolution")
 Donal Woods – Downton Abbey (for "Christmas at Downton Abbey")
 John D. Kretschmer – Homeland (for "The Choice")
 Richard Hoover – The Newsroom (for "We Just Decided To")

Episode of a Half Hour Single-Camera Television Series
Judy Becker – Girls (for "Pilot")
 Denise Pizzini – Community (for "Pillows and Blankets")
 Richard Berg – Modern Family (for "Misery Date")
 Ian Phillips – Parks and Recreation (for "Soda Tax")
 Tony Fanning – The New Normal (for "Sofa's Choice")

 Multi-Camera Unscripted Series:
Keith Raywood, Eugene Lee, Akira Yoshimura & N. Joseph DeTullio – Saturday Night Live (for "Host: Mick Jagger")
 Glenda Rovello – 2 Broke Girls (for "And The Silent Partner")
 Stephan G. Olson – How I Met Your Mother (for "The Magician's Code, Part 1")
 Bruce Rodgers – Democratic National Convention
 Anton Goss and James Pearse Connelly – The Voice

 Miniseries or Television Movie:
Mark Worthington – American Horror Story: Asylum (for "I Am Anne Frank, Part 2")
 Michael Corenblith – Game Change
 Derek R. Hill – Hatfields & McCoys
 Geoffrey Kirkland – Hemingway & Gellhorn
 Michael Wylie – Mockingbird Lane

External links
The winners and nominees on the official website

2012 film awards
2012 guild awards
Art Directors Guild Awards
2013 in American cinema